is a Japanese footballer currently playing as a midfielder for Fukushima United.

Career statistics

Club
.

Notes

References

External links

2002 births
Living people
Association football people from Tokyo
Japanese footballers
Association football midfielders
Tokushima Vortis players